Michal Vilkovský (born 13 August 1993 in Levoča) is a Slovak football striker who currently plays for club Spišské Podhradie.

FK Senica 
Born in Levoča. Michal began his career in FK Spišská Nová Ves, later MFK Ružomberok and 2010 he joined FK Senica. Vilkovský made his official debut for FK Senica on 4 May 2012, playing the last 12 minutes in a 2–0 home win against MFK Ružomberok.

External links 
 FK Spišská Nová Ves official club profile
 Futbalnet profile
 FK Senica profile

References

1993 births
Living people
Association football forwards
Slovak footballers
Slovak expatriate footballers
FK Senica players
Slovak Super Liga players
FK Varnsdorf players
FC ŠTK 1914 Šamorín players
FC Lokomotíva Košice players
FK Spišská Nová Ves players
ŠK Odeva Lipany players
FK Slavoj Trebišov players
People from Levoča
Sportspeople from the Prešov Region
2. Liga (Slovakia) players
Expatriate footballers in the Czech Republic
Slovak expatriate sportspeople in the Czech Republic